Soykan is a Turkish surname and male given name formed by the combination of the Turkish words soy ("strain; race, lineage, ancestry") and kan ("blood"). However more probably kan is a corruption of han  ("khan, ruler") which would make the meaning "noble ruler". Notable people with the name include:
 Ebru Soykan (1981–2009), Turkish civil rights activist
 Ömer Naci Soykan (1945–2017), Turkish philosopher
 Pınar Soykan (born 1980), Turkish singer

References

Turkish-language surnames
Turkish masculine given names